KOZL-TV (channel 27) is a television station in Springfield, Missouri, United States, affiliated with MyNetworkTV. It is owned by Nexstar Media Group alongside Osage Beach–licensed Fox affiliate KRBK (channel 49); Nexstar also provides certain services to CBS affiliate KOLR (channel 10) under a local marketing agreement (LMA) with Mission Broadcasting. The stations share studios on East Division Street in Springfield, while KOZL-TV's transmitter is located on Switchgrass Road, north of Fordland.

History

Early history
The station first signed on the air in 1968 as KMTC; founded by Meyer Communications, it originally operated as the market's first full-time ABC affiliate. It originally operated from studios located on East Cherry Street in Springfield. Prior to its sign-on, ABC programming had been limited to off-hours clearances on KYTV (channel 3) and KTTS-TV (channel 10, now KOLR) from their respective sign-ons in October and March 1953. Although the Springfield market had had a large enough population to support three full-time network affiliates since the 1950s, prospective station owners were skeptical about launching a UHF station in a market that stretched across a large and mostly mountainous swath of Missouri and Arkansas. UHF stations have never gotten very good reception across large areas or rugged terrain. In 1980, the station adopted the on-air brand "C-27". In 1985, the station was purchased by Woods Communications; after the sale was finalized, channel 27 changed its call letters to KDEB-TV (named after Deborah Woods, the daughter of the president of Woods Communications).

As a Fox affiliate

In January 1985, KMTC renewed its ABC affiliation. The following month, TV syndicator Telepictures, who had recently purchased cross-town independent KSPR (channel 33), attempted to persuade ABC to make an affiliation agreement via a presentation to the network. ABC then convinced KMTC to develop their own presentation for the network that would defend the station's right to keep the affiliation. After seeing the presentations, ABC remained uncertain about whether or not to change affiliations, but agreed to remain with KMTC for the remainder of 1985, after which Woods closed on the purchase of the station, now renamed KDEB. It was decided that the purchase price on the station would be lowered if ABC yanked its programs off of KDEB by July 1986.

On April 3, 1986, ABC terminated its affiliation agreement with KDEB and moved it to KSPR. Woods later successfully sued the network for fraud, but ultimately lost the case on appeal. KDEB briefly became an independent station, then opted to become a charter affiliate of Fox, which launched on October 9, 1986. In 1993, Woods sold the station to Banam Broadcasting, a subsidiary of BankAmerica. Banam sold KDEB along with three of its stations (WTVW in Evansville, Indiana, KARD in West Monroe, Louisiana, and KLBK-TV in Lubbock, Texas) to Petracom Broadcasting in 1995. In 1998, Petracom sold KDEB-TV to Quorum Broadcasting. On November 30, 2001, the station's -tall broadcast tower (which it shared with KTXR (101.3 FM)) collapsed as a result of overnight ice accumulation. A replacement transmitter was installed on the tower used by KOLR and KSPR, adjacent from the channel 27 tower site. The transmitter facility had been sold to the American Tower Corporation, which also owns the current tower.

On December 31, 2003, Quorum Broadcasting, owner of CBS affiliate KOLR, merged with Nexstar; as the Springfield market did not have enough television stations to permit a legal duopoly, KOLR was instead sold to Brecksville, Ohio–based Mission Broadcasting. This arrangement placed KDEB-TV in the unusual position of being the senior partner as a Fox-affiliated station in a virtual duopoly with a CBS affiliate (most virtual or legal duopolies involving a Fox affiliate and a Big Three-affiliated station result in the Fox affiliate serving as the junior partner); from September 2011 (when channel 27 lost its Fox affiliation) to September 2014 (when it joined MyNetworkTV) it was the only duopoly (virtual or legal) in existence involving a "Big Three" station in which an independent station serves as the senior partner. The station changed its call letters to KSFX-TV in 2005.

The station was one of many Fox affiliates that planned to decline to air O. J. Simpson's two-night interview special with Judith Regan on November 27 and 29, 2006 called If I Did It. Station management cited overwhelmingly negative viewer feedback as the reason for the preemption. KSFX was preparing to air past Christmas episodes of The Simpsons instead on both nights within the program's designated timeslots; however, Fox would cancel the special nationally before it aired.

The station's broadcasts became digital-only, effective June 12, 2009.

As an independent station
On June 20, 2011, Fox announced that it would end its affiliation with KSFX and Fort Wayne, Indiana sister station WFFT-TV. Nexstar had earlier lost the Fox affiliation for WTVW in Evansville, Indiana following a dispute with the network over retransmission consent fees, and Nexstar subsequently decided to drop the Fox affiliation from its Terre Haute, Indiana affiliate (WFXW), which became an ABC affiliate under the new callsign WAWV-TV. The last Fox program to air on KSFX was Buried Treasure on August 31, 2011, which ended at 9:00 p.m. Central Time.

On September 1, 2011, the Fox affiliation moved to Osage Beach-licensed MyNetworkTV affiliate KRBK (channel 49), which had launched two years earlier in August 2009; channel 27, meanwhile, changed its callsign to KOZL-TV and converted into an independent station; the station began using the on-air branding "Ozarks Local". With the change, KOZL began filling prime time hours formerly occupied by Fox network programming with syndicated programming (initially, the newsmagazines Inside Edition and The Insider, along with the sitcoms My Name is Earl and Everybody Loves Raymond on weeknights), along with family-oriented movies on Sunday nights. The station also acquired local broadcast rights to college basketball games from the Southeastern Conference through ESPN Plus, featuring double-header games airing on Saturday afternoons, occasional Wednesday night games and the first two rounds of the SEC tournament.

On September 10, 2012, KOZL changed its on-air branding to "Z-27," using a logo similar to that used by sister stations WCIX in Springfield, Illinois, and KARZ-TV in Little Rock, Arkansas. With WTVW joining The CW in January 2013 and WFFT rejoining Fox the following March, KOZL was the only Nexstar-owned-or-managed television station that was affected by the 2011 Nexstar-Fox dispute that remained an independent station until September 8, 2014, when it replaced KRBK as Springfield's MyNetworkTV affiliate. Nexstar subsequently agreed to acquire KRBK in 2018.

On June 15, 2016, Nexstar announced that it has entered into an affiliation agreement with Katz Broadcasting for the Escape, Laff, Grit, and Bounce TV networks (the last one of which is owned by Bounce Media LLC, whose COO Jonathan Katz is president/CEO of Katz Broadcasting), bringing the four networks to 81 stations owned and/or operated by Nexstar, including KOZL-TV and KOLR.

Programming

Syndicated programming
Syndicated programs broadcast by KOZL-TV include Modern Family, Two and a Half Men, Friends, The People's Court and Seinfeld among others.

Newscasts
KOLR presently produces 8½ hours of locally produced newscasts each week (with 1½ hours each weekday and a half-hour each on Saturdays and Sundays) for KOZL-TV. Upon its launch in 1968, channel 27 (as KMTC) launched a news department. Upon becoming a Fox affiliate in 1986, the station cut back on its local news programming, airing only a 10:00 p.m. newscast until 1995; news updates continued to air on the station afterward. In 2005, full-fledged newscasts returned to the station with the debut of a nightly half-hour 9:00 p.m. newscast produced by KOLR; an hour-long weekday morning newscast at 7:00 a.m. was later added in 2009.

In March 2010, KOLR became the third television station in the Springfield market to begin broadcasting its local newscasts in widescreen standard definition; the KSFX newscasts were included in the upgrade, making KOLR/KSFX the first Nexstar-owned duopoly (legal or virtual) to broadcast their news programming in a widescreen format. In May 2011, channel 10 became the third station in the market to begin broadcasting its local newscasts in high definition; as with the prior upgrade to widescreen production, the KSFX newscasts were included in the upgrade. With the switch to HD, KSFX introduced a new secondary set and graphics package for its newscasts, the latter of which closely resembled the Fox News Channel-inspired graphics used by Fox's owned-and-operated stations.

When channel 27 became an independent station on September 1, 2011, the newly called KOZL expanded its locally produced programming; the morning newscast expanded to two hours from 7:00 to 9:00 a.m. On September 4, KOZL debuted a half-hour 6:00 p.m. newscast on Sundays (it was the only newscast in the market at that timeslot as KOLR as well as KYTV and KSPR carry network prime time programming during that hour); then on September 6, KOZL debuted an hour-long weekday 4:00 p.m. news/lifestyle program, titled Ozarks Live. Also that month, KOZL launched half-hour sports wrap-up programs on Saturday and Sunday evenings after the 9:00 p.m. newscast, both under the Ozarks Sports banner, as well as the Sunday evening local business program Ozarks Local Business Journal (which aired after the 6:00 p.m. newscast). Over time, many of these programs were scaled back or cancelled entirely; the morning newscast was reduced to one hour and Ozarks Live moved to KOLR in August 2012, while Ozarks Sports Saturday/Sunday, Ozarks Business Journal and the Sunday 6:00 p.m. newscast were cancelled.

Subchannels
The station's ATSC 1.0 channels are carried on the multiplexed digital signals of sister stations KOLR and KRBK:

ATSC 3.0 lighthouse

References

External links
OzarksFirst.com - KOLR/KRBK/KOZL-TV official website

MyNetworkTV affiliates
Ion Mystery affiliates
Bounce TV affiliates
Rewind TV affiliates
Television channels and stations established in 1968
OZL-TV
1968 establishments in Missouri
Nexstar Media Group
ATSC 3.0 television stations